Cody Kearsley is a Canadian actor, best known for his portrayal of Moose Mason in the CW series Riverdale and Turbo Pokaski in the Netflix series Daybreak.

Career
Kearsley debuted in a starring role in Borealis, where he was credited as the writer and actor. The film was released in 2016. He then, went on to play a minor role in the 2017 film Power Rangers. In the same year, Kearsley starred in a drama series Spiral, which lasted one season. He was later cast as Moose Mason in the Archie Comic-based CW television adaptation, Riverdale. He had a recurring role in the first three seasons before leaving mid-season in the third season. In 2018, Kearsley finished working on Gemini, a short sci-fi film. Recently, Kearsley starred as Turbo Bro Jock in the Netflix series Daybreak. Kearsley has also ventured into producing, producing upcoming film Kingdom Come and 2020 TV show Three Little Pieces.

Filmography

Films

Television

References

External links

1991 births
Living people
Canadian male television actors
Male actors from British Columbia
People from Kelowna